Mangelia congoensis is a species of sea snail, a marine gastropod mollusk in the family Mangeliidae.

Description

Distribution
This marine species was found at the estuary of the Zaire River, Congo

References

  Thiele J., 1925. Gastropoden der Deutschen Tiefsee-Expedition. In:. Wissenschaftliche Ergebnisse der Deutschen Tiefsee-Expedition auf dem Dampfer “Valdivia” 1898-1899  II. Teil, vol. 17, No. 2, Gustav Fischer, Berlin

External links
  Tucker, J.K. 2004 Catalog of recent and fossil turrids (Mollusca: Gastropoda). Zootaxa 682:1-1295.

congoensis
Gastropods described in 1925